Constanzo Mangini (11 June 1918 – 3 July 1981) was an Italian ice hockey player. He competed in the men's tournament at the 1948 Winter Olympics.

References

1918 births
1981 deaths
Ice hockey people from Milan
Ice hockey players at the 1948 Winter Olympics
Italian ice hockey players
Olympic ice hockey players of Italy